Wenonah is a neighborhood on the southeast side of Minneapolis, Minnesota. Its boundaries are 54th Street to the north, 34th Avenue to the east, the Minneapolis-Saint Paul International Airport to the south, and Cedar Avenue to the west. The neighborhood contains a portion of Lake Nokomis. It shares a neighborhood organization with the Keewaydin, Minnehaha, and Morris Park neighborhoods, which are collectively referred to as Nokomis East and are served by the Nokomis East Neighborhood Association (NENA).

Geography

Wenonah is located in the southeast portion of Minneapolis, as part of a greater community of 11 neighborhoods called Nokomis. Its boundaries are defined by 54th Street East to the north, 34th Avenue South to the east, the Minneapolis-Saint Paul International Airport to the south, and Cedar Avenue to the west. For the most part, the neighborhood lies to the north of Minnesota State Highway 62 with the exception of a vestigial 33-property area surrounded on three sides by the Airport and only connected to the greater neighborhood by 28th Avenue South, which runs below Highway 62. The neighborhood also encompasses a portion of Lake Nokomis to the northwest.

Wenonah borders three other neighborhoods directly, including Diamond Lake to the west, Keewaydin to the north, and Morris Park to the east, and touches corners with Minnehaha to the northeast. Keewaydin, Morris Park, Minnehaha, and Wenonah together comprise the community of Nokomis East.

Politics
In city council elections, Wenonah is a part of Minneapolis's eleventh ward.

References

External links
Minneapolis Neighborhood Profile - Wenonah
Nokomis East Neighborhood Association

Neighborhoods in Minneapolis